Matthew Andrews works at Bell Labs in Murray Hill, New Jersey. He was named Fellow of the Institute of Electrical and Electronics Engineers (IEEE) in 2015 for contributions to network design and wireless resource allocation.

References

External links

20th-century births
Living people
Fellow Members of the IEEE
Year of birth missing (living people)
Place of birth missing (living people)
American electrical engineers